Lake Lapovac  is  an  accumulation  lake  located  between  Našice  and  Markovac Našički, in  Croatia.

Sources
 http://www.tznasice.hr/izdvojene-destinacije/jezero-lapovac/ 

Lapovac
Lapovac
Geography of Osijek-Baranja County